Independencia District is one of twelve districts of the province Huaraz in Peru.

Geography 
The Cordillera Blanca traverses the district. Some of the highest peaks of the district are Pallqarahu, Pukaranra, Ranrapallqa and Rurichinchay. Other mountains are listed below:

 Churup
 Hatun Kunka
 Puka Qaqa Punta
 Rima Rima
 Uqshapallqa
 Tullparahu

See also 
 Pallqaqucha
 Qillqaywank'a
 Tullpaqucha
 Willkawayin

References

Districts of the Huaraz Province
Districts of the Ancash Region